Frank Anechiarico  is Maynard-Knox Professor of Government and Law at Hamilton College.

Books
 The pursuit of absolute integrity : how corruption control makes government ineffective (University of Chicago Press, 1996)

References 

Hamilton College (New York) faculty